Heidi Boghosian, a lawyer, is the executive director of the A.J. Muste Memorial Institute. Previously she was the executive director of the National Lawyers Guild, a progressive bar association established in 1937, where she oversaw the legal defense of people targeted by government. She co-hosts the weekly civil liberties radio show Law and Disorder, that airs on Pacifica Radio's WBAI, New York, and is broadcast on more than 100 other stations.

Government Surveillance
Boghosian's work often focuses on how technology affects our daily lives. In a 2010 Huffington Post article titled "Are You Chip-Ready", Boghosian discusses radio-frequency identification (RFID) technology that has been making its way into many people's lives including students whose attendance can now be tracked by a RFID chip implanted in their student ID cards. She points out identity theft, stalking, government spying, and security breaches as just some of the negative outcomes of RFID technology.

In 2012, Boghosian documented her own data trail to show how everyday transactions and ventures are captured and stored, most times without our knowledge. From the surveillance monitor outside of her apartment building, to a purchase at a local coffee shop, Boghosian illustrates how corporations play a larger role in people's daily lives. The National Security Agency (NSA), for instance, collects metadata on every phone call Americans make, as was revealed in June 2013 by Edward Snowden.

Bibliography
Spying on Democracy: Government Surveillance, Corporate Power, and Public Resistance (City Lights, 2013) 
The Business of Surveillance, ABA Human Rights, Vol. 39 No. 3, 2013]
Police Brutality: Opposing Viewpoints, Chapter: "Antiterrorism policies result in police abuse of dissenters (Greenhaven Press, 2006) 
Applying Restraints to Private Police (Missouri Law Review, Vol. 70, Issue 1, Winter 2005)
The Assault on Free Speech, Public Assembly, and Dissent (North River Press, 2004)

References

External links
]

American lawyers
American people of Armenian descent
Living people
Radio-frequency identification
American women lawyers
Temple University Beasley School of Law alumni
Brown University alumni
Boston University alumni
Year of birth missing (living people)
21st-century American women